Vila Nova da Rainha may refer to the following places in Portugal:

 Vila Nova da Rainha (Azambuja), a civil parish in the municipality of Azambuja
 Vila Nova da Rainha (Tondela), a civil parish in the municipality of Tondela